Michael O'Leary (8 May 1936 – 11 May 2006) was an Irish judge, politician and barrister who served as a Judge of the District Court from 1997 to 2006, Tánaiste and Minister for Energy from 1981 to 1982, Leader of the Labour Party from 1981 to 1982 and Minister for Labour from 1973 to 1977. He served as a Teachta Dála (TD) from 1965 to 1987. He was a Member of the European Parliament (MEP) from 1979 to 1981.

He resigned from the Labour Party in 1982 to join Fine Gael.

Early life
O'Leary was born in Cork in 1936. He was the son of a publican, O'Leary was educated at Presentation College, University College Cork, Columbia University, and King's Inns. On returning to Ireland, he became involved in the Labour Party and was employed as Education Officer for the Irish Transport and General Workers' Union (ITGWU). In this role he was instrumental in establishing the Universities Branch, affiliated to Dublin North-Central constituency, bringing together Labour Party students of the Dublin University Fabian Society in Trinity College Dublin and of University College Dublin.

Political career
O'Leary was first elected to Dáil Éireann as a Labour Party TD for Dublin North-Central at the 1965 general election. His agent was Bob Mitchell, Chairman of Dublin University Fabian Society, who could claim credit in a dirty campaign for picking up transfers to squeeze out the Labour Party front-runner on the 11th recount.

When he was first elected to the Dáil, O'Leary encouraged the Labour Party to take a more left-wing stance in its policies. He was initially strongly opposed to the idea of a coalition with Fine Gael, but following the 1969 general election he believed that there was a need for a new approach. When the Labour Party and Fine Gael formed the National Coalition government following the 1973 general election he was appointed Minister for Labour.

In 1977, he was narrowly defeated by Frank Cluskey for the leadership of the party. O'Leary was elected to the European Parliament for the Dublin constituency in 1979.

Cluskey resigned as Labour Party leader when he lost his Dáil seat at the 1981 general election and O'Leary was elected unanimously to succeed him. In the short-lived Fine Gael–Labour Party government of 1981 to 1982, O'Leary became Tánaiste and Minister for Energy. After the government's defeat at the February 1982 general election he remained leader until he suddenly resigned both the leadership and his party membership on 28 October, in the aftermath of a party conference vote on a potential coalition with Fine Gael. On 3 November he joined Fine Gael. At the November 1982 general election, he was elected a Fine Gael TD in the Dublin South-West constituency. After the election, a new Fine Gael–Labour government was formed, but O'Leary was kept out of cabinet office by his former Labour colleagues.

In 1985, O'Leary introduced a private member's bill on divorce which preceded the government's own 1986 divorce referendum.

When the Progressive Democrats were formed in 1985 he considered joining, but remained with Fine Gael.

He did not contest the 1987 general election and afterwards he moved back to Cork and practised as a barrister. He was elected as a Fine Gael member of Cork City Council at the 1991 local elections. He unsuccessfully contested the 1992 general election in Cork North-Central and received about 2% of the valid poll.

He was appointed a District Court judge in 1997 by the Fine Gael–Labour Party–Democratic Left coalition government.

Death
O'Leary died in France in May 2006, following a drowning accident in a swimming pool. He was on holiday, having retired as a judge just days earlier.

References

External links

1936 births
2006 deaths
People from Cork (city)
Deaths by drowning in France
Leaders of the Labour Party (Ireland)
Fine Gael TDs
Irish barristers
Politicians from County Cork
Tánaistí
Members of the 18th Dáil
Members of the 19th Dáil
Members of the 20th Dáil
Members of the 21st Dáil
Members of the 22nd Dáil
Members of the 23rd Dáil
Members of the 24th Dáil
Accidental deaths in France
Labour Party (Ireland) MEPs
MEPs for the Republic of Ireland 1979–1984
Columbia University alumni
People educated at Presentation Brothers College, Cork
Labour Party (Ireland) TDs
Alumni of King's Inns